The Democratic Justice Party (PJD) is a political party in Mauritania.

History
The party won two seats in the 2013 parliamentary elections.

References

Political parties in Mauritania